Seaway may refer to:

Seaway (band), a pop punk band from Canada.
 Sound (geography), a sea or ocean inlet larger than a bay, deeper than a bight, and wider than a fjord, or a narrow sea or ocean channel between two bodies of land
 Sea lane or shipping lane, a regularly-used route for vessels on oceans and large lakes
 Seaway (TV Series), Canadian drama series that aired on CBC Television 1965–1966